Everett Earl "King" Fisher (March 1, 1914 – December 16, 1963) was an American football player. 

A native of Napa, California, he attended Santa Rosa High School and played college football for Santa Clara. He played for the 1936 and 1937 Santa Clara teams that compiled a combined record of 17–1, including victories in back to back Sugar Bowl games. He then played professional football in the National Football League (NFL) for the Chicago Cardinals in 1938 and 1939 and for the Pittsburgh Steelers in 1940. He appeared in 26 NFL games as a blocking back and end. 

After his playing career ended, Fisher studied education at Redlands University and became a teacher. He died in 1963 at age 47 of an apparent heart attack at his home in San Carlos, California.

References

1914 births
1963 deaths
Chicago Cardinals players
People from Napa, California
Pittsburgh Steelers players
Santa Clara Broncos football players
Sportspeople from the San Francisco Bay Area
Players of American football from California